Disturbed may refer to:

Books	
 Disturbed, a 2011 novel by Kevin O'Brien (author)

Film and TV
 Disturbed (film), a 1990 film starring Malcolm McDowell
 "Disturbed" (Numb3rs), a 2009 episode of Numb3rs
 "The Disturbed", a 2009 episode of Deadly Women

Music
 Disturbed (band), formed 1994, an American heavy metal band

Albums
 Disturbed, 1997 album by R. Stevie Moore from R. Stevie Moore discography
 Disturbed (album), a 2001 album by Coo Coo Cal

Songs
"Disturbed", 2004 song by Sugababes from In the Middle, Part 1	
"Disturbed", 1989 song by Peter Gabriel from Passion: Music for the Last Temptation of Christ

See also
 Mental illness
 Posttraumatic stress disorder
 Disturbance (disambiguation)